Liuguiguo is the toponym for the Liugui people documented in old Chinese records, including the Xin Tangshu, Zizhi Tongjian, and Wenxian Tongkao. Its location is uncertain, being placed by some in the area of Kamchatka and others beyond to the northeast. The description on Matteo Ricci's map corresponds with what is known from these texts, both the Xin Tangshu and Zizhi Tongjian referring to furs, the former also to their inability to ride. A Liugui "tribute embassy" to the Tang in the fourteenth year of Zhenguan (640) is also documented.

See also
 Okhotsk culture

References

Archaeological cultures of East Asia